TSI may refer to:

Science, technology and engineering
 Technology Schools Initiative
 Thyroid stimulating immunoglobulin
 Time-Slot Interchange, communications network switches
 Total solar irradiance received at top of atmosphere
 Triple sugar iron test or TSI slant, of a microorganism's ability to ferment sugars
 Trophic state index of plant nutrients in waterbodies
 Turbo fuel stratified injection, a VW engine trademark TSI or TFSI

Standards, and standards organisations
 Technical Specifications for Interoperability within European railways
 Trading Standards Institute, a British professional association
 Trustworthy Software Initiative, UK
 Turkish Standards Institution, a public standards organization in Turkey

Companies
 TekSavvy Solutions Inc., Canadian telecommunications company
 Telesensory Systems Inc., maker of products for the blind
 Town Sports International, an operator of fitness facilities

Organisations
 The Seasteading Institute, for creating dwellings on seaborne platforms in international waters
 Three Seas Initiative, European intergovernmental group

Media and entertainment
 Televisione svizzera di lingua italiana, Swiss Italian-language TV

Other uses
 Texas Success Initiative, a guide for developmental education to ensure college readiness in the state of Texas
 Time in Turkey, generally abbreviated with its usage in Turkish, ''Türkiye Saati İle
 Tissue saturation index in medical near-infrared spectroscopy
 True strength index of financial markets
 Trauma symptom inventory, a psychological assessment instrument